Oliver Pikati (born 19 May 1973) is a Botswanan former footballer who played as a striker. He played for the Botswana national football team between 1994 and 2002.

External links

Association football forwards
Botswana footballers
Botswana international footballers
1973 births
Living people
Botswana Police XI SC players